{{Speciesbox
| image = 
| image2 = 
| taxon = Charaxes figini
| authority = van Someren, 1969 <ref>Van Someren, V.G.L. 1969. Revisional notes on African Charaxes (Lepidoptera: Nymphalidae). Part V. Bulletin of the British Museum (Natural History) (Entomology) 23: 75-166.</ref>

| synonyms =Charaxes viola figini van Someren, 1969 Charaxes etheocles f. figini Storace, 1948 Charaxes figinii}}Charaxes figini'' is a butterfly in the family Nymphalidae. It is found in Ethiopia (western Eritrea). The habitat consists of thornveld savanna. The holotype is in Museo Civico di Storia Naturale di Genova.

References

Butterflies described in 1969
figini
Endemic fauna of Ethiopia
Butterflies of Africa